Monk's Blues is an album by Thelonious Monk accompanied by a big band arranged and conducted by Oliver Nelson. Originally released by Columbia Records in 1968, it was re-released on CD in 1994. Produced by Teo Macero, the album was recorded in Los Angeles by Monk's working quartet augmented by a group of Hollywood studio musicians.

Track listing

Side One
 "Let's Cool One" - 3:47
 "Reflections" - 4:35
 "Rootie Tootie" - 7:35
 "Just a Glance at Love" (Teo Macero) - 2:52
 "Brilliant Corners" - 3:52

Side Two
 "Consecutive Seconds" (Macero) - 2:41
 "Monk's Point" - 8:03
 "Trinkle, Tinkle" - 4:59
 "Straight, No Chaser" - 7:20

CD Bonus Tracks
 "Blue Monk" - 6:14
 "'Round Midnight" - 4:13

All compositions by Thelonious Monk, except where noted. Arranged by Oliver Nelson.

Personnel
The Quartet
 Thelonious Sphere Monk - piano
 Charlie Rouse - tenor saxophone
 Larry Gales - bass
 Ben Riley - drums

Additional musicians
 Oliver Nelson – conductor
 Buddy Collette, Tom Scott, Gene Cipriano & Ernie Small - saxophone
 Bobby Bryant, Conte Candoli & Freddie Hill - trumpet
 Lou Blackburn, Bob Bralinger, Billy Byers & Mike Wimberly - trombone
 Howard Roberts - guitar
 John Guerin - drums

References

1968 albums
Thelonious Monk albums
Columbia Records albums
Albums produced by Teo Macero